A blog comment hosting service is a service which externally hosts comments posted by users to blog or online newspaper posts. Many such services allow for users to log into a blog comment hosting service using social network profile credentials such as those of Facebook Connect, Yahoo!, Google, LinkedIn, Myspace, etc. Such services may also have an effect upon instances of comment spam, as prior registration with comment hosts may be the only means by which to make comments onto many blogs.

Comparison of blog comment hosting services

References 

Blogging
Web hosting